The 2009 Milan–San Remo cycling race took place on 21 March 2009. It was the 100th edition of the Milan–San Remo monument classic, and followed the same route as the previous year. Manx sprint specialist Mark Cavendish won by a narrow margin. Heinrich Haussler made a late attack with 250 metres to the finish and rode away but Cavendish made up Haussler's 10m lead with 100m to go. The race was the fourth event in the inaugural UCI World Ranking.

Team List

Results

References

External links

Milan–San Remo
March 2009 sports events in Europe
Milan - San Remo, 2009
Milan - San Remo
2009 in road cycling